Carl Jerome Barber (April 25, 1916 – September 23, 1994) was an American professional golfer who played on the PGA Tour. He had seven wins on tour, including a major title, the PGA Championship in 1961.

Born in Woodson, Illinois, Barber was one of nine children raised on an Illinois farm near Jacksonville, and turned professional in 1942. Small in stature, he was one of the top putters of his era.

Barber was a full-time member of the PGA Tour from 1948 to 1962. He played on two Ryder Cup teams, 1955 and 1961; and was also the team captain in 1961. Barber earned a living primarily as a club professional like most of the touring pros of his generation; he worked at Los Angeles' Wilshire Country Club. He was the Player of the Year on the PGA Tour in 1961, unseating Arnold Palmer for a year.

At the 1961 PGA Championship in Illinois near Chicago, heavy rains wiped out Friday's second round and it had to be replayed on Saturday, followed by the final two rounds on Sunday. Barber led after the second round but trailed Don January by four shots with three holes to play in the final round. In high heat and humidity, Barber made a  birdie putt at the 16th hole, a  par-saving putt at 17, and a  birdie putt at 18 to tie January and force an 18-hole Monday playoff. Due to the double-rounds and a lengthy delay caused by another rainstorm in the morning, Barber and January did not complete their final rounds on Sunday until well past 8 pm. Barber won the playoff the next day by a single stroke when January bogeyed the 18th hole. At age 45, he was the oldest player at the time to win a major title, surpassed seven years later by Julius Boros in 1968 at age 48.

Barber holds the record for the oldest player to ever play on the PGA Tour in February 1994, when he played in the Buick Invitational at Torrey Pines at the age of 77 years, 10 months. He died later that year, in September.

In 1966, he portrayed himself in a guest appearance on episode #23 ("Watch the Birdie") of I Dream of Jeannie.

Barber and his wife Lucile, who died of cancer in 1968, had five children: Tom, Nancy, twins Sandra and Sally, and Roger. Barber died in Glendale, California at the age of 78, after having mitral valve prolapse and suffering a stroke.

Professional wins (13)

PGA Tour wins (7)

PGA Tour playoff record (1–0)

Other wins (5)
this list may be incomplete
1950 Pennsylvania Open Championship
1951 Waterloo Open Golf Classic
1952 Waterloo Open Golf Classic
1959 California State Open, Southern California PGA Championship

Other senior wins (2)
1987 Liberty Mutual Legends of Golf - Legendary Division (with Doug Ford)
1993 Liberty Mutual Legends of Golf - Demaret Division

Playoff record
Senior PGA Tour playoff record (0–1)

Major championships

Wins (1)

1Defeated Don January in an 18-hole Monday playoff, 67 to 68

Results timeline

Note: Barber never played in The Open Championship.

WD = Withdrew
CUT = missed the half-way cut
R64, R32, R16, QF, SF = Round in which player lost in PGA Championship match play
"T" indicates a tie for a place

Summary

Most consecutive cuts made – 8 (1959 PGA – 1962 Masters)
Longest streak of top-10s – 2 (1956 Masters – 1956 U.S. Open)

U.S. national team appearances
Ryder Cup: 1955 (winners), 1961 (winners, captain)
Hopkins Trophy: 1954 (winners), 1955 (winners)
Diamondhead Cup: 1974 (winners)

See also
List of men's major championships winning golfers

References

External links

GolfCompendium.com: 1961 PGA Championship

American male golfers
PGA Tour golfers
PGA Tour Champions golfers
Ryder Cup competitors for the United States
Winners of men's major golf championships
Golfers from Illinois
People from Morgan County, Illinois
Burials at Rose Hills Memorial Park
1916 births
1994 deaths